is a Japanese actress, voice actress, and narrator from Tokyo, Japan.

Biography
Ogasawara was born in Japan.

Filmography

Television animation
Cowboy Bebop - Meifa
D.Gray-man - Lulubell
Devil Lady - Ninomiya Tomoe
Ghost in the Shell: Stand Alone Complex - Reiko Kanzaki (ep 19)
Heroman - Holly Jones
Kekkaishi - Ryou Shishio (ep 31)
Mobile Suit Gundam 00 - Soma Peries ; Haro(Orange)
Mokke - Fumi Matsunaga
Oh! Edo Rocket - O-riku
Panty & Stocking with Garterbelt - Panty
Tales of Vesperia - Hisca AiheapWindy Tales - AtsukoWolf's Rain - Cheza

Video gamesSuper Robot Wars Z2 (Soma Peries)Super Robot Wars UX (Holly Jones, Soma Peries, orange Haro)

Dubbing roles
Live-action
Lindsay LohanFreaky Friday – Anna ColemanConfessions of a Teenage Drama Queen – Mary Elizabeth "Lola Steppe" CepMean Girls – Cady HeronGeorgia Rule – Rachel Wilcox
Alison LohmanMatchstick Men – AngelaFlicka – Katy McLaughlinThings We Lost in the Fire – KellyThe Accountant – Dana Cummings (Anna Kendrick)American Beauty – Jane Burnham (Thora Birch)Carriers – Kate (Emily VanCamp)Cheaper by the Dozen – Lorraine Baker (Hilary Duff)The Day After Tomorrow – Laura Chapman (Emmy Rossum)December Boys – Lucy (Teresa Palmer)Girl, Interrupted – Polly "Torch" Clark (Elisabeth Moss)Gran Torino – Sue Lor (Ahney Her)Hard Candy – Hayley Stark (Elliot Page)Harry Potter film series – Fleur Delacour (Clémence Poésy)iCarly – Shelby Marx (Victoria Justice)Ice Princess – Casey Carlyle (Michelle Trachtenberg)Imagine Me & You – Rachel (Piper Perabo)Katy Keene – Katy Keene (Lucy Hale)Nancy Drew – Nancy Drew (Emma Roberts)Percy Jackson & the Olympians: The Lightning Thief – Annabeth Chase (Alexandra Daddario)The Perfect Man – Holly Hamilton (Hilary Duff)Phenomena – SophiePretty Little Liars – Aria Montgomery (Lucy Hale)Racing Stripes – Channing Walsh (Hayden Panettiere)Resident Evil: Afterlife – K-Mart (Spencer Locke)Resident Evil: Extinction – K-Mart (Spencer Locke)The Seeker: The Dark Is Rising – Maggie Barnes (Amelia Warner)Spider-Man 3 – Gwen Stacy (Bryce Dallas Howard)A Tale of Two Sisters – Bae Su-yeon (Moon Geun-young)The United States of Leland – Becky Polard (Jena Malone)

AnimationKim Possible – Kim PossibleUnderdogs'' – Laura

References

External links
 

1980 births
Living people
Japanese child actresses
Japanese video game actresses
Japanese voice actresses
Voice actresses from Tokyo